The Netherlands national handball team is the national handball team of Netherlands and is controlled by the Netherlands Handball Association. Unlike the very successful women's team, The Netherlands men's team qualified only once for the World Championships (1961) and twice for the European Championships (2020 & 2022). For the 2023 World Men's Handball Championship The Netherlands has received a wildcard.  

But the team is steadily closing the gap with the leading European teams. In only their second ever appearance at EHF EURO 2022 the Dutch men's team won three matches and drew one. The Dutch did qualify for the Main round and finished as 10th overall.

Competitive record

World Championship

European Championship

Current squad
Squad for the 2023 World Men's Handball Championship.

Head coach: Staffan Olsson

References

External links

IHF profile

Men's national handball teams
Handball in the Netherlands
National sports teams of the Netherlands